Lin Fong-cheng (born 20 March 1940) is a Taiwanese politician. He was the Vice Chairman of the Kuomintang from April 2007 to April 2014.

Kuomintang Secretary-General

2005 Mainland China visit

In April 2005, Lin joined Lien Chan and other Pan-Blue officials to visit mainland China. Prior to their departure, Lin said that the trip aimed to seek constructive dialogue on the peaceful development of cross-strait relations.

Kuomintang Vice Chairmanship

May 2009 Mainland China visit
In May 2009, Lin joined Wu Po-hsiung and other Kuomintang high officials to visit Mainland China for an 8-day visit. He and the delegations visited several Chinese Mainland cities, from Beijing, Hangzhou, Nanjing and Chongqing.

July 2009 Mainland China visit
In July 2009, Lin and delegates participated in the 5th Cross-Strait Economic, Trade and Culture Forum in Changsha, Hunan on 11–12 July. The forum ended with a joint proposal to promote cultural exchanges across the Taiwan Strait. After the forum, they visited Mawangdui.

2013 cross-strait forum
In June 2013, Lin attended a cross-strait forum in Xiamen, Fujian in which the Chinese mainland officials unveiled more measures to increase exchanges and cooperation with Taiwan. The forum was attended by Zhang Zhijun, Director of Taiwan Affairs Office and Yu Zhengsheng, Chairman of the National Committee of the CPPCC.

April 2014 Mainland China visit
In early April 2014, Lin visited Xi'an, Shaanxi to meet with Zhao Zhengyong, the Secretary of the Shaanxi Provincial Committee of the Communist Party of China. They attended public memorial ceremony for Yellow Emperor. Zhao made a remark saying that Lin has made great efforts to promote the cross-strait exchanges and cooperation, and added that people from both sides are family. He also hoped that the two sides could appreciate the hard-won prospect, further expand the cooperation and benefit the people.

References

Taiwanese Ministers of the Interior
Living people
1940 births
Taiwanese Ministers of Transportation and Communications